Infected Nations is the second album by English thrash metal band Evile. It was released on 21 September 2009 in Europe and 22 September in the United States.

The album was produced by Russ Russell (Napalm Death, Dimmu Borgir) at Parlour Studios in Kettering, England. The cover art was created by Michael Whelan and is based on a concept by Matt Drake.

It is the last album to feature bassist Mike Alexander, who died while on tour just weeks after the release.

In an interview with the gaming company Harmonix, Ol Drake announced that he is making the album available in the video game Rock Band via the Rock Band Network.

Track listing

Credits

Band members 
 Matt Drake – lead vocals, rhythm guitar, guitar solo on track 1, cover concept
 Ol Drake – lead guitar
 Mike Alexander – bass
 Ben Carter – drums

Additional personnel 
 Michael Whelan – cover illustration
Simon Moody – layout
Sam Scott-Hunter – photo
 Russ Russell – production

References 

2009 albums
Evile albums
Earache Records albums
Albums with cover art by Michael Whelan